The first season of Myanmar Idol premiered on December 11, 2015 and continued until April 8, 2016. It was won by Saw Lah Htaw Wah. The first season was co-hosted by Kyaw Htet Aung, the latter of whom left the show after the season ended.

Regional auditions
Auditions were held in Mandalay, Taunggyi, Mawlamyine, Pathein, and Yangon from October to November 2015, and around 10,000 attended the auditions.

But three contestants didn't continue participate for family problem. So, only 83 contestants continue performed in Golden Week.

Structure of auditions
There are usually two stages in the audition process. In the first round they sing in front the executive producers and more are eliminated. In the second round those who survive the first stage sing in front of the judges and this is the audition shown on television. Those who gain at least two "yes" votes from the three judges then receive a golden ticket to Golden Week.

Golden Week
It featured three rounds: Round 1, Group Round, and Solo Round.  In the first round, each contestant sang individually, and after they sang, they gathered in a line. Those who impressed the judges advanced to the next round where the contestants performed in groups of four or five, singing a song together. The remaining auditionees who passed the group rounds performed their final solos to advance in the Green Mile.

Green Mile
Color key:

Top 11 Finalists and stages
Saw Lah Htaw Wah, Nin Zi May, M Zaw Rain, Saw Htet Naing Soe, Sophia Everest, Zaw Min Oo, May Kyi, Aung Tay Zar Kyaw, Aung Pyae Htun, Rio

Color key:

Week 1: Top 11–

Week 2: Top 10 – 1980s

Week 3: Top 9–Hit songs
Sophia Everest was saved by judges. So there was no elimination in this week.

Week 4: Top 9 – Htoo Eain Thin's songs

Week 5: Top 7 – Rock Music

Week 6: Top 6 – summer songs

Week 7: Top 5+ Wild Card winner – Burmese Film theme songs

Week 8: Top 5 – Composer Saung Oo Hlaing's songs
Double eliminated because of previous week chose wild card winner.

Week 9: Finale
The Top two performed their winner’s song Judges chose song and contestants chose themselves song.

References

Myanmar Idol
2015 television seasons
2016 television seasons